Curacoa may refer to:

Geography
 Curacoa Island, Queensland, Australia
 Curacoa volcano, Tonga

Naval vessels
Four ships of the Royal Navy have been named HMS Curacoa:
 , a 36-gun fifth-rate ship launched in 1809. She was reduced to 24 guns in 1831 and broken up in 1849
 , a wood-screw frigate launched in 1854, she was flagship of the Australia Station during the New Zealand Land Wars and was broken up in 1869
 , a screw corvette launched in 1878 and sold in 1904
 , a C-class light cruiser launched in 1917 and accidentally sunk by RMS Queen Mary in 1942

Other
 "Curacoa", archaic form of the word "curaçao", especially in reference to liquor

See also 
 Curaçao (disambiguation)
 Curassow
 Kurakawa